Dennis Magloyuan Regino (April 9, 1961 – November 29, 2020), known professionally as April Boy Regino, was a Filipino singer, songwriter, and actor who popularized ballads such as "Paano ang Puso Ko", "Umiiyak ang Puso" and "Di Ko Kayang Tanggapin" in the 1990s and novelty songs such as "Ye Ye Vonnel". He always wore a baseball cap in public as a trademark.

Early life
Dennis Magloyuan Regino was born on April 9, 1961, in Marikina. He was the fourth of Tomas and Lucena's eight children, and grew up in a slum near the railway track in Caloocan.

As a child, he helped his parents sell snacks (rice cakes, banana cue and camote cue), and customers would often ask him to sing. At age 10, he began joining amateur singing contests for the prize money. He left school after sixth grade to focus on singing, and aside from contests, he also performed in local fiestas and as an opening act for other musicians. At age 18, he became a singer in Japan.

Music career
Regino returned to the Philippines in 1993, and together with his brothers Vingo and Jimmy, formed the musical group April Boys. Their debut song, "Sana'y Laging Magkapiling", became widely popular. However, in 1995, Regino left the group to pursue a solo career. In a 2015 interview with Jessica Soho, he explained that the brothers competed among themselves which led to sulking, but they later reconciled.

His first solo album, Umiiyak ang Puso, was released in 1995 under Ivory Music and sold 120,000 units (triple platinum). The song of the same name won Best Country-Ballad Recording in that year's Awit Awards.

He migrated to the United States and was based there as an entertainer to the Filipino-American community. More recently, he was a contract recording artist with Viva Records.

He also did a Tagalog and English cover version of the song いとしのエリー("Itoshi no Ellie"), renaming it "Honey My Love So Sweet".

In 2015 after a year off, Regino returned to music with his brand new album and a new music company, GMA Music.

Personal life
Regino was married to Madelyn Regino. The couple had a son named JC and daughter named Charm. JC Regino followed his father's footsteps as a singer and composer.

Regino took his oath as a United States citizen in March 2011.

Health and death
In 2009, Regino was diagnosed with prostate cancer while living in the United States. In 2013, he announced that he was already cancer-free after years of battling the illness. In 2015, the singer shared that he had diabetic retinopathy, which is an eye condition that can cause vision loss and blindness in people with diabetes. 

At 1:00 a.m. of November 29, 2020, Regino was admitted to the Metro Antipolo Hospital and Medical Center in Antipolo. He was diagnosed with chronic kidney disease and acute respiratory failure. He was scheduled to undergo dialysis however it was not taking place during that time. Regino died at 3:00 a.m., at the age of 59. He was survived by his widow, Madelyn Regino, and two children, JC and Charmaine. On December 6, Regino was entombed in his mausoleum at Valley of Sympathy Memorial Park, Antipolo, Rizal.

Discography

Songs
1993: "Dugong Pilipino" (with April Boys)
1993: "Sana'y Laging Magkapiling" (with April Boys; original Japanese pop song as "Kampai" by Nagabuchi Tsuyoshi)
1995: "Umiiyak ang Puso"
1995: "Nasaan Ka, Kailangan Kita (Sa Gabi Di Makatulog)"
1996: "Paano ang Puso Ko"
1997: "Di Ko Kayang Tanggapin"
1997: "Kahit Kaibigan Lang"   
1997: "Pag-ibig Mo, Pag-ibig Ko" 
1997: "Mahal na Mahal na Mahal Kita" 
1997: "Esperanza" (theme song of the TV series of the same name)
1998: "Salamat Sa Iyo"
1998: "Tukaan" (theme song from the TV show)
2000: "Kahapong Nagdaan (Ayoko ng Balikan)" 
2000: "Sabi ng Puso Ko"
2004: "Nanghihinayang Ako" 
2004: "Madelyn (Nag-iisang Ginto)"
2004: "Pasumpa-sumpa" 
2005: "Ye Ye Vonnel"
2010: "Di Na Ako Iibig Pang Muli" (with JC Regino) 
2010: "Hanggang Sa Dulo ng Aking Buhay" (with JC Regino)
2015: "Tanging Hiling" (first and only gospel song)
2019: "Hanggang sa Wakas"

Filmography

Film
 Ang Misis Kong Hoodlum (1996)
 Takot Ako sa Darling Ko (1997)
 Di Ko Kayang Tanggapin (2000)
 Super Idol (2001)
 Ang Tanging Ina N'yong Lahat (2008) (special participation)
 This Guy's in Love with U Mare! (2012) (special participation)

Notes

References

External links
 

1961 births
2020 deaths
Filipino pop singers
20th-century Filipino male singers
Filipino singer-songwriters
Filipino male film actors
Filipino emigrants to the United States
GMA Music artists
People from Antipolo
People from Marikina
People from Rizal
Singers from Metro Manila
Star Music artists
Tagalog people
Tenors
Viva Records (Philippines) artists
21st-century Filipino male singers
21st-century Filipino male actors